Chellapilla Satyanarayana Sastry (1933 - 12 January 1989), known mononymously as Satyam, was an Indian music composer. He was popular in the Telugu and Kannada film industries in the 1960s to 1980s. Sathyam is best remembered as "Andhra R. D. Burman". He also composed a handful of Bengali, Bhojpuri, and Hindi films.

Satyam was born in Gunanupuram village,Komarada mandal  in Vizianagaram district of Andhra Pradesh. He had acted in some plays with popular writer Rajasri and others at Vizianagaram. He later shifted to Madras and worked in the orchestra of P. Adinarayana Rao and T. V. Raju. He worked as an assistant composer in the magnum opus film Suvarna Sundari (1957). He debuted as a music director in the 1963 Kannada film Sri Ramanjaneya Yuddha. His debut film as a full-fledged music director in Telugu cinema was Pala Manasulu (1967), though he was credited as a music director in the 1963 film Savati Koduku under the supervision of T. V. Raju.

Some of his memorable hit songs in Telugu are Ye Divilo Virisina Parijatamo, Gunna Mamidi Komma Meeda, O Bangaru Rangula Chilaka, Kalise Kalla Lona, Tholi Valape Teeyanidi, Aaraneekuma Ee Deepam Karthika Deepam, Gaali Vanalo Vana Neetilo.

His grandson Sri Vasanth is also a music composer who worked for films like Sudigadu (2012). In memory of Satyam, a musical night was organized by Bay Area Telugu Association and Chimata Music in California, United States, in 2009.

Discography

Telugu

Kannada

Tamil
Mudi Soodaa Mannan (1978)

Hindi
 Rani Aur Jaani (1973)
 Alakh Niranjan (1975)
 Aaj Ke Sholay (1985)
 Jhony Meraa Yaar (1973)
 Lady James Bond (1972)
 Gunah ki Raat (1979)
 Mahashakthi (1980)
 Inspector Rekha (1973)
 Apna Farz(1973)
 Khoon Ki Holi (1979)
 Kaun Sacha Kaun Jutha (1972)

See also
Vijaya Bhaskar
T. G. Lingappa
G. K. Venkatesh
Rajan–Nagendra
Upendra Kumar
M. Ranga Rao

References

External links
 

Telugu film score composers
Kannada film score composers
1933 births
1989 deaths
20th-century Indian composers
Film musicians from Andhra Pradesh